Bárzana is one of thirteen parishes (administrative divisions) in Quirós, a municipality within the province and autonomous community of the Principality of Asturias, in northern Spain.

The population is 497.

Villages
 L'Arroxín
 Bárzana
 La Casa Vide
 Cuañana
 El Pando
 Pontonga
 Rano
 El Regustiu
 Santa Marina
 Vaḷḷín

References 

Parishes in Quirós